Raphitominae was a subfamily of small to quite large sea snails, marine gastropod mollusks in the superfamily Conoidea.

Bouchet, Kantor et al. elevated in 2011 the subfamily Raphitominae (which at that point had been placed in the family Conidae) to the rank of family. This was based on a cladistical analysis of shell morphology, radular characteristics, anatomical characters, and a dataset of molecular sequences of three gene fragments.

Genera
Genera within the subfamily Raphitominae used to include:
 Acrobela Thiele, 1925
 Buccinaria Kittl, 1887
 Daphnella Hinds, 1844
 Gymnobela Verrill, 1884
 Homotoma Bellardi, 1875
 Kermia Oliver, 1915
 Leufroyia Monterosato, 1884
 Pleurotomella Verrill, 1872
 Raphitoma Bellardi, 1848
 Taranis Jeffreys, 1870
 Thatcheria Angas, 1877

Genera brought into synonymy 
 Allo Jousseaume, 1934 : synonym of Taranis Jeffreys, 1870
 Clathurina Melvill, 1917  : synonym of Kermia Oliver, 1915
 Cordiera  : synonym of Cordieria Rouault, 1848
 Eudaphne Bartsch, 1931 : synonym of Daphnella Hinds, 1844
 Ootoma Koperberg, 1931  : synonym of Buccinaria Kittl, 1887
 Ootomella Bartsch, 1933  : synonym of Buccinaria Kittl, 1887
 Pionotoma Kuroda, 1952 : synonym of Buccinaria Kittl, 1887
 Rhaphitoma  : synonym of Raphitoma Bellardi, 1848
 Speoides Kuroda & Habe, 1961 : synonym of Gymnobela Verrill, 1884

References

 Vaught, K.C. (1989). A classification of the living Mollusca. American Malacologists: Melbourne, FL (USA). . XII, 195 pp

Further reading 
 Kantor Y. I. & Taylor J. D. (2002). "Foregut anatomy and relationships of raphitomine gastropods (Gastropoda: Conoidea: Raphitominae)". In" "Systematics, Phylogeny and Biology of the Neogastropoda." Ed by Oliverio, M. and R. Chemello, editors. Boll Malacologico. Suppl. 5: 161–174.

External links
 Fassio, G.; Russini, V.; Pusateri, F.; Giannuzzi-Savelli, R.; Høisæter, T.; Puillandre, N.; Modica, M. V.; Oliverio, M. (2019). An assessment of Raphitoma and allied genera (Neogastropoda: Raphitomidae). Journal of Molluscan Studies

Raphitomidae